En Directo is the first live album by Argentine band Patricio Rey y sus Redonditos de Ricota recorded and released in 1992.
It was recorded at the Estadio Obras Sanitarias in Buenos Aires.

Track listing
 Nuestro amo juega al esclavo [Our master plays as slave]
 Barbazul versus el amor letal [Barbazul vs lethal love]
 Yo no me caí del cielo [I didn't fell from heaven]
 Héroe del whisky [Whisky hero]
 La parabellum del buen psicópata [The good psychopath's parabellum]
 Maldición va a ser un día hermoso [Damn, it's going to be a beautiful day]
 El blues del noticiero [News bulletin blues]
 Todo un palo [An entire stick]
 Unos pocos peligros sensatos [A few sensible dangers]
 Criminal mambo 
 Rock para los dientes [Rock for the teeth]
 Vamos las bandas [Let's go, bands]

Personnel
Indio Solari - Vocals
Skay Beilinson - Guitars
Semilla Buccarelli - Bass guitar, Piano on "Mi perro dinamita"
Walter Sidotti - Drums and percussion
Sergio Dawi - Saxophone

1992 live albums
Patricio Rey y sus Redonditos de Ricota albums
Live albums recorded in Buenos Aires